Alfred Harrison Powell (March 6, 1781August 1, 1831) was a U.S. Representative from Virginia.

Born in Loudoun County, Virginia, Powell was graduated from Princeton College.
He studied law, was admitted to the bar, and commenced practice in Winchester, Virginia in 1800.
He also served as member of the state senate in 1812–1819.

Powell was elected as an Adams candidate to the Nineteenth Congress (March 4, 1825 – March 3, 1827).
He served as delegate to the Virginia Constitutional Convention of 1829-1830.
He died in Loudoun County, Virginia, in 1831.

Sources

1781 births
1831 deaths
Virginia lawyers
People from Loudoun County, Virginia
Virginia Democratic-Republicans
National Republican Party members of the United States House of Representatives from Virginia
19th-century American politicians
19th-century American lawyers